Maloyaroslavetsky District is an administrative and municipal district (raion), one of the twenty-four in Kaluga Oblast, Russia. It is located in the northeast of the oblast. Its administrative center is the town of Maloyaroslavets. Population:  The population of Maloyaroslavets accounts for 60.9% of the district's total population.

References

Notes

Sources

Districts of Kaluga Oblast